The Östergötland Infantry Regiment was a Swedish Army infantry regiment with origins that traces back to the 16th century. In 1791, they were merged into another unit to form a new regiment, the Life Grenadier Regiment. The regiment's soldiers were recruited from the province of Östergötland.

History 
The regiment has its origins in fänikor (companies) raised in Östergötland in the 16th century. In 1619, these units—along with fänikor from the nearby Jönköping County—were organised by Gustav II Adolf into the grand regiment Östergötlands storregemente, of which nine of the total 24 companies were recruited in Östergötland. Östergötlands storregemente consisted of three field regiments, of which Östgöta infanteriregemente was one. Sometime between 1623 and 1628, the grand regiment was permanently split into three smaller regiments, of which the Östergötland Infantry Regiment was one.

The regiment was officially raised in 1636 although it had existed since the 1620s. The Östergötland Infantry Regiment was one of the original 20 Swedish infantry regiments mentioned in the Swedish constitution of 1634. The regiment's first commander was Johan Banér. It was allotted in 1685.

In 1791, Östergötland Infantry Regiment was merged with the Östergötland Cavalry Regiment in 1791 to form the Life Grenadier Regiment. The reorganisation and renaming to a "life grenadier" title of honour was conducted in regard to the regiment's achievements during Gustav III's Russian War. Within the new regiment, the Östergötland Infantry Regiment was renamed to Livgrenadjärregementets rotehållsdivision and retained some form of independence.

Campaigns 
The Northern Seven Years' War (1563–1570)
The War against Sigismund (1598–1599)
The Polish War (1600–1629)
The Kalmar War  (1611–1613)
The Thirty Years' War (1630–1648)
The Torstenson War (1643–1645)
The Northern Wars (1655–1661)
The Scanian War (1674–1679)
The Great Northern War (1700–1721)
The Gustav III's Russian War (1788–1790)

Organisation 

1634(?)
Livkompaniet
Överstelöjtnantens kompani
Majorens kompani
Ydre kompani
Östanstångs kompani
Kinds kompani
Västanstångs kompani
Vadstena kompani

17??(?)
Livkompaniet
Stångebro kompani
Kinds kompani
Östanstångs kompani
Ombergs kompani
Vreta Klosters kompani
Motala kompani
Ydre kompani

Name, designation and garrison

See also 
List of Swedish regiments
Provinces of Sweden

References 
Print

Online

Notes 

Infantry regiments of the Swedish Army
Military units and formations established in 1634
Military units and formations established in 1791
Disbanded units and formations of Sweden